Henry Clay Hodges Jr. (April 20, 1860 – July 15, 1963) was a United States Army officer in the late 19th and early 20th centuries. He served in several conflicts, including World War I.

Military career
Hodges was born at Fort Vancouver in Vancouver, Washington, on April 20, 1860. His father was Henry C. Hodges, an Army officer, and his mother, Annie Abernethy, was the daughter of George Abernethy, the first elected governor of Oregon Territory. Hodges was appointed to the United States Military Academy (USMA) at West Point, New York, by Ulysses S. Grant, who was friends with his father, and he graduated in 1881. He was the second youngest member of his class. Among his fellow classmates included several men who would, like Hodges himself, eventually attain the rank of general officer, such as Joseph T. Dickman, Enoch Crowder, John Biddle, Clarence Page Townsley, Francis Joseph Kernan, Joseph Alfred Gaston, Charles H. Barth, George True Bartlett, Edwin St. John Greble and John Frank Morrison.

Hodges was commissioned into the 22nd Infantry Regiment, and he initially was stationed at Fort Clark, Texas. While there, he helped round up some Comanche Indians who had escaped their reservation. Hodges served as an aide to General Christopher C. Augur from 1884 to 1885, and he worked at USMA in 1896 as an assignment professor of mathematics. He then was stationed at Fort Keogh. Hodges taught at the Groton School and then at the University of New Hampshire as Professor of Military Science and Tactics. After serving at Fort Crook, Nebraska, starting in 1896, Hodges was sent to the Philippines. He participated in putting down the Moro Rebellion and fought in eleven battles there. After serving in Boston and Newport, Rhode Island, Hodges returned to the Philippines. After serving as Secretary of the General Staff from June 11, 1913, to August 31, 1914, he went to the 17th Infantry Regiment in Eagle Pass, Texas because of the Border War.

Hodges was promoted to the rank of major general on August 5, 1917, almost three months after the American entry into World War I, and assumed command over the 39th Division at Camp Beauregard. When he left the camp with the division, the people of Alexandria, Louisiana gave him a chest with 200 silver coins with his name on them. Hodges served in France during World War I with his division. He returned to Camp Beauregard after the war ended, and he commanded the 17th Division until its deactivation. Reverting to his permanent rank of brigadier general, after the war came to an end on November 11, 1918, Hodges was sent to Hawaii. He retired on December 1, 1920.

Hodges lived in Connecticut as a retiree, first at Noroton, Connecticut, and then at Stamford, Connecticut, after his second wife's death. He died on July 15, 1963, and at the time of his death, he was the oldest living graduate of USMA. He is buried at Arlington National Cemetery with his first wife Netta Richmond Haines (1861–1919).

Personal life
Hodges married Netta Richmond Haines on December 24, 1891, and they had three children together. She died in 1919. Hodges then married Carrie Jones on December 27, 1920, and they lived together until her death in 1949.

References

Bibliography

1860 births
1963 deaths
United States Army Infantry Branch personnel
People from Vancouver, Washington
People from Stamford, Connecticut
People from Fairfield County, Connecticut
United States Army generals of World War I
United States Military Academy alumni
University of New Hampshire faculty
Burials at Arlington National Cemetery
United States Army generals
United States Army War College alumni
United States Military Academy faculty
American military personnel of the Indian Wars
American centenarians
Men centenarians
Military personnel from Washington, D.C.